Rhinogobius duospilus is a species of goby native to China and Vietnam where they can be found in fresh or brackish waters. This species can reach a length of  TL.  In their natural environment these fish consume larvae or other similar creatures, but they can be fed brine shrimp or blood worms.

References

duospilus
Freshwater fish of China
Fauna of Hong Kong
Fish of Vietnam
Fish described in 1935
Taxa named by Albert William Herre